Kelvin Ng (born November 10, 1958) is a former territorial and municipal level politician in Canada who was elected in both the Nunavut Legislature and Northwest Territories Legislature.

Ng began his political career on the municipal level. He has served on municipal council and as Mayor of Cambridge Bay, Nunavut.

Ng ran for a seat in the 1995 Northwest Territories general election. He defeated incumbent MLA Ernest Bernhardt to win the Kitikmeot electoral district. Ng served one term in the Northwest Territories Legislature, becoming a cabinet Minister in the government. His district was abolished in 1999 when Nunavut was created from the Northwest Territories.

Ng ran for a seat to the Legislative Assembly of Nunavut in the first general election held in 1999. Ng won the Cambridge Bay electoral district, and was appointed to the cabinet as the first Minister of Finance for the territory. He served one term before retiring in 2004 at the dissolution of the legislature to devote more time to his family.

References

External links
Nunavut Votes 2004 Cambridge Bay Profile

Members of the Legislative Assembly of the Northwest Territories
Members of the Legislative Assembly of Nunavut
21st-century Canadian politicians
Living people
Mayors of places in Nunavut
Deputy premiers of Nunavut
1958 births
People from Cambridge Bay
Canadian politicians of Chinese descent